Nothobaccharis is a genus of Peruvian flowering plants in the tribe Eupatorieae within the family Asteraceae.

Species
The only known species is Nothobaccharis candolleana, endemic to Peru.

References

Eupatorieae
Monotypic Asteraceae genera
Endemic flora of Peru